Spring Hill Library is a red brick and terracotta Victorian building in Ladywood, Birmingham, England.

Designed in 1891 by Frederick Martin of Martin & Chamberlain with a  clock tower on the corner of Icknield Street and Spring Hill and opened on 7 January 1893, it now stands next to a roundabout and linked via a glazed atrium to a new (2010) Tesco superstore. The site was previously the location for the turnpike gate house for Icknield Street.

Still in use as a Birmingham branch library, it is a Grade II* listed building.

Notes

References
Birmingham Libraries – History of Spring Hill Library
Spring Hill Architecture – article by Joe Holyoak 1974
Pictures of Spring Hill Library in context with neighbouring buildings: Search for "Spring Hill Library" from Birmingham Images

Libraries in Birmingham, West Midlands
Ladywood
Public libraries in the West Midlands (county)
Terracotta
Library buildings completed in 1891
1891 establishments in England
Grade II* listed buildings in the West Midlands (county)
Gothic Revival architecture in the West Midlands (county)